Yudhistir Das (c. 25 September 1923 – February 18, 2014) was an Indian politician. He was elected to the Odisha Legislative Assembly in the 1990 polls, as a Janata Dal candidate. He served as speaker of the Odisha Legislative Assembly. As of 2000, he was the president of Viswa Oriya Sammilan (a cultural organisation).

References

1923 births
2014 deaths
Janata Dal politicians
Members of the Odisha Legislative Assembly
Speakers of the Odisha Legislative Assembly
Lok Dal politicians
Janata Party politicians